Étalon de Yennenga (English:Stallion of Yennenga) is an award bestowed to distinguished individuals involved with the Burkinabe's silver screen, awarded by the Panafrican Film and Television Festival of Ouagadougou (FESPACO), in recognition of the grand prize for the Best Film. First commenced in 1972, it is considered as the most prestigious award in Africa cinema.

History
The 'Étalon de Yennenga' means Stallion of Yennenga refers to Princess Yennenga, the founding myth of the Mossi Empire, the main ethnic group in Burkina Faso. The story of Yennenga dates back to the beginning of the 12th century in the Mossi's Dagomba Kingdom. The soldiers of Dagomba's king, Nedega, were brave and almost always won in any show of force. Nedega's daughter, Yennenga, who was a horse-woman, and adept at using javelins, spears and bows.

Award
It is shared by Burkina Faso's most popular film makers, Idrissa Ouedraogo. Ouedraogo won the Yennenga prize in 1991 for the film Tilai. The first winner of this prize is the Voltaïque Kollo Daniel Sanou in 1983 with his film Pawéogo (The Emigrant).

In 2005, 19th edition of FESPACO, two new awards titled "Stallion" were awarded. The trophy of the Stallion Award was made by Burkinabe sculptor Ali Nikiméa. The Yennenga Standard Grand Prize then becomes the Yennenga Gold Standard Grand Prize, and the new awards are named Yennenga Silver Standard and Yennenga Bronze Standard.

References

African awards